The National Prize for Natural Sciences was created in 1992 as one of the replacements for the National Prize for Sciences under Law 19169. The other two prizes in this same area are for Exact Sciences and Applied Sciences and Technologies.

It is part of the National Prize of Chile.

Winners
 1992, Jorge Allende (biochemistry)
 1994, Humberto Maturana (neurobiology)
 1996,  (hydrobiology)
 1998, Juan Antonio Garbarino Bacigalupo (chemistry)
 2000,  (biophysics)
 2002, Ramón Latorre (biophysics)
 2004, Pedro Labarca Prado (biophysics)
 2006, Cecilia Hidalgo Tapia (biochemistry)
 2008,  (neurobiology)
 2010, Mary Kalin Arroyo (botany)
 2012,  (marine biology)
 2014, Ligia Gargallo (chemistry)
 2016, Francisco Rothhammer Engel (genetics)
 2018,  (ecology)

See also

 List of biology awards
 List of earth sciences awards
 List of chemistry awards
 List of medicine awards
 List of neuroscience awards
 List of psychology awards
 CONICYT

References

1992 establishments in Chile
Awards established in 1992
Chilean science and technology awards
Earth sciences awards
Chemistry awards
Biology awards
Medicine awards
Neuroscience awards
Cognitive science awards
1992 in Chilean law